Good Hope Country Day School, formerly St. Croix Country Day School prior to a merger in 2013 with the Good Hope School, is an independent, non-sectarian, non-profit, college preparatory school serving all grades from PreK-12 located in Kingshill, St. Croix, US Virgin Islands. The student body is made up of 490 students.

Athletics & Competition
Good Hope Country Day School is a member of the St. Croix Interscholastic Athletic Association, and competes in a vast array of sports throughout the year.

Fall
 Varsity Football (All Private Schools)
 Varsity Volleyball (Boys & Girls)
 Junior Varsity Volleyball (Boys & Girls)
 Middle School Volleyball (Girls)
 Sailing Team (Co-Ed)
 Elementary Baseball (Boys)

Winter
 Varsity Basketball (Boys and Girls)
 Junior Varsity Basketball (Boys and Girls)
 Middle School Basketball (Boys and Girls)
 Elementary Basketball (Boys and Girls)

Spring
 Varsity Soccer (Co-Ed)
 Junior Varsity Soccer (Co-Ed)
 Elementary Soccer (Co-Ed)
 Varsity Baseball (Boys)
 Varsity Softball (Girls)
 Varsity Tennis
 Varsity Golf

GHCDS won the 2015 SCIAA varsity soccer championships.

Prior to the merger, St. Croix Country Day School and The Good Hope School were varsity soccer rivals. In 2010, SCCDS beat GHS for the sixth time in seven season.

The varsity volleyball teams are perennially among the leaders on island as well.

Other competitions include Quiz Bowl and Science Bowl. Country Day has won the last six Virgin Islands territorial Quiz Bowl championships dating back to 2003, and has competed in the national competition in each of those years, including a national playoff appearance in 2008.

References

High schools in the United States Virgin Islands